Jane Louise Barkman (born September 20, 1951), also known by her married name Jane Brown, is an American former swimmer, two-time Olympic champion, and former world record-holder.

Career
Barkman represented the United States as a 17-year-old at the 1968 Summer Olympics in Mexico City.  She won a gold medal as a member of the winning U.S. team in the women's 4×100-meter freestyle relay, together with teammates Linda Gustavson, Sue Pedersen, and Jan Henne.  She and her relay teammates  set a new Olympic record of 4:02.5 in the event final.  Individually, she also received a bronze medal for her third-place performance in the women's 200-meter freestyle.  Barkman finished behind Debbie Meyer, and Jan Henne, completing an American sweep of the event.

Four years later at the 1972 Summer Olympics in Munich, she was also part of the U.S. team that won the gold medal in the women's 4×100-meter freestyle relay, including Sandy Neilson, Jenny Kemp and Shirley Babashoff.  Neilson, Kemp, Barkman and Babashoff set a new world record of 3:55.19 in the final, narrowly edging the East German team. Barkman served as a Tri-Captain of the 1972 team and was a Torchbearer carrying the torch en route to the 1996 Atlanta Olympic Games.

Barkman was formerly the coach of the Princeton Tigers women's swimming and diving team at Princeton University.  She is the mother of two sons and a daughter.  She now resides in a small town in Pennsylvania and is a kindergarten and first grade teacher.

See also

 List of Olympic medalists in swimming (women)
 World record progression 4 × 100 metres medley relay

References

External links
 

1951 births
Living people
American female freestyle swimmers
World record setters in swimming
Olympic bronze medalists for the United States in swimming
Olympic gold medalists for the United States in swimming
People from Bryn Mawr, Pennsylvania
Swimmers at the 1968 Summer Olympics
Swimmers at the 1972 Summer Olympics
Medalists at the 1972 Summer Olympics
Medalists at the 1968 Summer Olympics
21st-century American women